Yuliya Larionova (born 18 August 1984) is an Azerbaijani football referee and a former player who played as a forward. She has been a member of the Azerbaijan women's national team.

References

1984 births
Living people
Women's association football forwards
Women association football referees
Women's association football referees
Azerbaijani women's footballers
Azerbaijan women's international footballers
Azerbaijani football referees